The .43 Spanish was a centerfire firearms cartridge developed by  Remington  designers around 1867. It was used in early rolling block rifles that Remington manufactured for the government of Spain. The cartridge is also referred to as the .433 Spanish, "11mm Spanish", and identical cartridges for the US Peabody rifle were marked "U.M.C. 43-77".

History 
The .43 Spanish cartridge was produced after Spain purchased the newly invented rolling-block action. The breech-loading firearm, which was marketed by Sam Remington, impressed the Spaniards after their own evaluation. In 1869, the Spanish government put in an order for 10,000 rifles. Aside from the firearms, however, they also wanted their own cartridge and Remington manufactured the .43 Spanish. It was produced in two variants: the bottlenecked .43 Spanish (11.15 x 57R Remington Spanish) and the straight-walled case .43 Spanish Reformado (11.4 x 57R Reformado).

The cartridge was almost similar to the .44-77 cartridge except for the difference in their diameters. The Spanish military version of the cartridge was later upgraded in 1889 to a "heavier, brass-jacketed reformado bullet". While Remington stopped manufacturing the cartridge in 1918, its use in the United States became widespread after World War II because it was sold as a surplus.

"Poison bullet" 
The .43 Spanish used a .454-inch diameter bullet that weighed 396 grains. Its 1,280 fps was powered by 74 grains of powder. Instead of solid lead bullet, the .43 Spanish used a brass-jacket bullet, which was considered unusual because cupronickel, gilding metal, and copper clad steel were preferred for bullet jackets during the period. It was also the reason why American soldiers suspected that the Spaniards used poison in their bullet during the Spanish-American War. It corroded in the tropics, producing a powdery pale green verdigris once they are exposed to high humidity or salty sea air over time. The brass component, however, improved bullet penetration.

Firearms chambered
Argentine Modelo 1879, rifle and carbine
1869 Spanish Peabody
Whitney–Burgess–Morse lever-action rifle (military version)
Model 1879 Remington–Lee

References

Further reading
 Croft Barker. Shooting the .43 Spanish Rolling Block. Cistern Publishing, 2003. 
Thombs, David A., and Barrett, Stephen P. The internet and firearms research with reference to the .43 Spanish Remington Rolling-Block and its ammunition, The Journal of the Historical Breechloading Small Arms Association, Vol.4, No.4, pp. 14–23

External links
.43 Spanish Remington, Cartridge Collector

Pistol and rifle cartridges
Military cartridges